Preston University (Pakistan) is a private university in Pakistan.  It was established as the School of Business and Commerce in 1984. The university is currently located in Kohat (main campus), Islamabad, Peshawar, Lahore, Karachi. It is recognized by the Higher Education Commission of Pakistan (HEC).

Preston University is the first private university of Pakistan and now has one of the largest networks of campuses in the country.

References

https://www.hec.gov.pk/english/universities/Pages/Illegal-DAIs.aspx

http://preston.edu.pk/

External links 
Preston University, Pakistan website
 http://hec.gov.pk/english/universities/Pages/Sindh/Preston-University.aspx

Universities and colleges in Lahore
Private universities and colleges in Pakistan